Tierra Verde is a census-designated place (CDP) in Nueces County, Texas, United States. Its population was 277 at the 2010 census. Prior to the census, it was part of the Spring Garden-Terra Verde CDP.

Geography
Tierra Verde is located at  (27.761571, -97.717384).

References

Census-designated places in Nueces County, Texas
Census-designated places in Texas
Corpus Christi metropolitan area